Soy is a 1973 album by Julio Iglesias.  A U.S. version was released in 1980. It was released on the Columbia label. An English language version of Soy called Así Nacemos was released to the United States and Canadian markets in the same year.

Track listing

Así Nacemos track listing 
Así nacemos (1st versión) 3:49
Tenía una guitarra 3:10 
Bla, bla, bla 3:40
Hace unos años 3:55 - 
Alguien que pasó 4:10 
Niña 3:42
A Chicago (Dear Mrs. Jane) 2:53
Dahil sa´yo 2:56
No es verdad 2:17
24 horas 4:25

References

Sources and external links
 Julio Iglesias Discography

1973 albums
Julio Iglesias albums
Spanish-language albums